Vighizzolo d'Este is a comune (municipality) in the Province of Padua in the Italian region Veneto, located about  southwest of Venice and about  southwest of Padua.

Vighizzolo d'Este borders the following municipalities: Carceri, Este, Piacenza d'Adige, Ponso, Sant'Urbano, Villa Estense.

References

Cities and towns in Veneto